Show-Ya Golden Best is a compilation of songs and of the Japanese hard rock group Show-Ya. The collection was released in 2002 in Japan.

Track listing
"Watashi Wa Arashi" (私は嵐) – 4:04
"Genkai Lovers" (限界 Lovers) – 4:00
"Sakebi" (叫び) – 4:25
"Ubaitore" (奪いとれ) – 4:00
"Aisazu ni Irarenai – Still Be Hangin' On" (愛さずにいられない – Still Be Hangin' On) – 4:57
"One Way Heart" – 4:17
"Touch Me" – 3:10
"Shidokenaku Emotion" (しどけなくエモーション) – 4:06
"Suteki ni Dancing (Coke Is It)" (素敵にダンシング – Coke Is It!) – 5:38
"Mizu no Naka no Toubousha" (水の中の逃亡者) – 3:58
"Love Sick" – 3:45
"Yoru Ga Kuru Made Nemuretai" (夜が来るまで眠りたい) – 4:30
"Fermata" (フェルマータ) – 4:09
"Kodoku no Meiro (Labyrinth)" (孤独の迷路（ラビリンス）) – 4:50
"Ai no Frustration" (愛の Frustration) – 4:25
"Uso Da To Itte Yo, Moon Light" (嘘だと言ってよ Moon Light) – 4:44
"Get Down" – 3:58
"Sono Ato de Koroshitai" (その後で殺したい) – 4:12

References

External links
Show-Ya discography 

Show-Ya albums
2002 compilation albums
EMI Records compilation albums
Japanese-language compilation albums